University Airpark  is a privately-owned, public use general aviation airport located  west-northwest of Bath, Michigan in Clinton County, Michigan, United States.

Facilities
The airport has one runway, designated as runway 8/26, which measures 1994 x 100 ft (608 x 30 m). It is attended intermittently.

No fuel is available at the airport.

For the 12-month period ending December 31, 2021, the airport had 400 general aviation aircraft operations, an average of 33 per month (a decrease from 639 operations in 2005).  At that time there were 5 aircraft based at this airport: 4 single-engine airplanes, and 1 helicopter.

Transit
The airport is accessible by road from Howe Road, and is located near the corner of Howe Road and Chandler Road.

External links

References

Airports in Michigan
Buildings and structures in Clinton County, Michigan
Transportation in Clinton County, Michigan
Bath Charter Township, Michigan